The meridian 131° west of Greenwich is a line of longitude that extends from the North Pole across the Arctic Ocean, North America, the Pacific Ocean, the Southern Ocean, and Antarctica to the South Pole.

The 131st meridian west forms a great circle with the 49th meridian east.

From Pole to Pole
Starting at the North Pole and heading south to the South Pole, the 131st meridian west passes through:

{| class="wikitable plainrowheaders"
! scope="col" width="130" | Co-ordinates
! scope="col" | Country, territory or sea
! scope="col" | Notes
|-
| style="background:#b0e0e6;" | 
! scope="row" style="background:#b0e0e6;" | Arctic Ocean
| style="background:#b0e0e6;" |
|-
| style="background:#b0e0e6;" | 
! scope="row" style="background:#b0e0e6;" | Beaufort Sea
| style="background:#b0e0e6;" |
|-valign="top"
| 
! scope="row" | 
| Northwest Territories Yukon — from  British Columbia — from 
|-valign="top"
| 
! scope="row" | 
| Alaska — Alaska Panhandle (mainland), Revillagigedo Island, and the Alaska Panhandle again
|-valign="top"
| style="background:#b0e0e6;" | 
! scope="row" style="background:#b0e0e6;" | Dixon Entrance
| style="background:#b0e0e6;" | Passing just east of Zayas Island, British Columbia,  (at ) Passing just west of Dundas Island, British Columbia,  (at ) Passing just west of Stephens Island, British Columbia,  (at )
|-
| style="background:#b0e0e6;" | 
! scope="row" style="background:#b0e0e6;" | Hecate Strait
| style="background:#b0e0e6;" |
|-
| 
! scope="row" | 
| British Columbia — Moresby Island and Kunghit Island
|-valign="top"
| style="background:#b0e0e6;" | 
! scope="row" style="background:#b0e0e6;" | Pacific Ocean
| style="background:#b0e0e6;" | Passing just west of Oeno Island,  (at )
|-
| style="background:#b0e0e6;" | 
! scope="row" style="background:#b0e0e6;" | Southern Ocean
| style="background:#b0e0e6;" |
|-
| 
! scope="row" | Antarctica
| Unclaimed territory
|-
|}

See also
130th meridian west
132nd meridian west

w131 meridian west